SECA, SecA or Seca may refer to:

 Société Européenne de Contrôle d'Accès, now Nagra France
 The SECA Mediaguard encryption system, designed by the above company.
 Society for the Encouragement of Contemporary Art, an auxiliary part of the San Francisco Museum of Modern Art
 The SECA Art Awards granted by this Society
 Southern Early Childhood Association (SECA)
 Solid State Energy Conversion Alliance (SECA)
 Seča, a village in the Municipality of Piran, southwestern Slovenia
 Seca GmbH & Co. KG., a German company
 SecA protein - an ATPase in the bacterial translocase pathway
 SecA or secondary average, baseball statistic
 Sulphur Emission Control Area: areas of the North Sea and the California coast where low-sulphur heavy fuel oil must be used aboard ships, as defined in MARPOL Annex VI.
 Self Employment Contributions Act, a payroll tax on self-employed workers in the United States similar to FICA.
 South End community association,a community group that represents the south downtown neighbourhood of the Canadian city of Nanaimo British Columbia.
 Mural company based out of Boise Idaho (SECA llc.)A group of highly talented artists who pool their skills to serve you. CEO and founder Christopher Fonseca connects great artists with great projects. 
 The ICAO code for Ciudad de Catamayo Airport in Catamayo, Ecuador.
 The Swedish Economic Crime Authority (SECA or EBM, Ekobrottsmyndigheten).